Otara was a New Zealand parliamentary electorate in Auckland, from 1984 to 1996. It existed for four parliamentary terms and was represented by three members of parliament, two from Labour and one from National.

Population centres
The 1981 census had shown that the North Island had experienced further population growth, and three additional general seats were created through the 1983 electoral redistribution, bringing the total number of electorates to 95. The South Island had, for the first time, experienced a population loss, but its number of general electorates was fixed at 25 since the 1967 electoral redistribution. More of the South Island population was moving to Christchurch, and two electorates were abolished, while two electorates were recreated. In the North Island, six electorates were newly created (including Otara), three electorates were recreated, and six electorates were abolished.

This suburban electorate was in the southern part of greater Auckland.

History

In the 1993 election, Trevor Rogers moved east to the new Howick electorate, which covered higher-income suburbs that traditionally voted for National. Taito Phillip Field won the electorate against Mr. Frith of National. When the Otara electorate was abolished in 1996, Field transferred to the Mangere electorate.

Members of Parliament
Key

Election results

1993 election

1990 election

1987 election

1984 election

Notes

References

Historical electorates of New Zealand
Politics of the Auckland Region
1984 establishments in New Zealand
1996 disestablishments in New Zealand